This article contains a list of productions made by the American animation studio Disney Television Animation as part of Disney Branded Television and owned by The Walt Disney Company. This list includes animated television series, films, specials, and other projects.

Television series

Short series 
The following is a list of short series not tied to any specific Disney TVA production or featuring characters from multiple Disney TVA productions. Some of these started as a spin-off from a specific Disney TVA series, before incorporating other Disney TVA properties.

Feature films and specials

TV Specials

Television films 
From 1990 to January 2003, Disney Television Animation had a division, Disney MovieToons/Disney Video Premiere, that produced direct-to-video and theatrical feature films. This unit's operations were transferred to Walt Disney Feature Animation in 2003. See that article for that unit's films.

Direct-to-video films

Theatrical films

Disney+ original films

Hybrid-released films

Short films

Miscellaneous work

Other credits

Notes

References

Disney Television Animation
Walt Disney
 
Disney Channel related-lists
Walt Disney Television Animation